Karlsruhe Zoo is located north of Karlsruhe Central Station in the city of Karlsruhe, Germany. It was opened in 1865 and is one of the oldest zoos in Germany. It has about 4,400 animals and 250 species.

Fire
A fire at the zoo on the night of 13 November 2010 killed 26 animals. The fire destroyed the petting zoo and killed all the animals contained therein, and then the fire spread to the elephant house and several animals there suffered severe burns.

References

External links

 Zoo's official website

Zoos in Germany
Tourist attractions in Karlsruhe
Buildings and structures in Karlsruhe
Zoos established in 1865
1865 establishments in Baden